During World War II, Lithuania was occupied by the Soviet Union (1940–1941), Nazi Germany (1941–1944), and the Soviet Union again in 1944. Resistance during this period took many forms. Significant parts of the resistance were formed by Polish and Soviet forces, some of which fought with Lithuanian collaborators. This article presents a summary of the organizations, persons and actions involved. Lithuania was de facto independent from June 24, 1941, until June 30, 1941, when Nazi Germany took full control of the area.

First Soviet occupation

In 1940, President Antanas Smetona fled to Germany, not wanting his government to become a puppet of the Soviet occupation. Soviet attempts to capture him were unsuccessful, and he was able to settle in the United States.

In 1940, Jan Zwartendijk, the Dutch consul in Kaunas, and Chiune Sugihara, the Japanese consul in Kaunas, and his wife Yukiko disobeyed orders and saved thousands of Jewish refugees from Poland by granting them visas.

In 1941, the Lithuanian Activist Front formed an underground government, and following the June uprising, the Provisional Government of Lithuania maintained sovereignty for a brief period.

Nazi German occupation

Soviet partisans began sabotage and guerrilla operations against German forces immediately after the Nazi invasion of 1941. The activities of Soviet partisans in Lithuania were partly coordinated by the Command of the Lithuanian Partisan Movement headed by Antanas Sniečkus and partly by the Central Command of the Partisan Movement of the USSR.

In 1943, the Nazis attempted to raise a Waffen-SS division from the local population as they had in many other countries, but due to widespread coordination between resistance groups, the mobilization was boycotted. The Lithuanian Territorial Defense Force (Lietuvos vietinė rinktinė) was eventually formed in 1944 under Lithuanian command, but was liquidated by the Nazis only a few months later for refusing to subordinate to their command.

There was no significant violent resistance directed against the Nazis. Some Lithuanians, encouraged by Germany's vague promises of autonomy, cooperated with the Nazis. Pre-war tensions over the Vilnius Region resulted in a low-level civil war between Poles and Lithuanians. Nazi-sponsored Lithuanian units, primarily the Lithuanian Secret Police, were active in the region and assisted the Germans in repressing the Polish population. In the autumn of 1943, the Home Army began retaliatory operations against the Lithuanian units and killed hundreds of mostly Lithuanian Auxiliary policemen and other collaborators during the first half of 1944. The conflict culminated in the massacres of Polish and Lithuanian civilians in June 1944 in the Glitiškės (Glinciszki) and Dubingiai (Dubinki) villages. See also Polish-Lithuanian relations during World War II.

Also in 1943, several underground political groups united under the Supreme Committee for the Liberation of Lithuania (Vyriausias Lietuvos išlaisvinimo komitetas, or VLIK). The committee issued a declaration of independence that went largely unnoticed. It became active mostly outside Lithuania among emigrants and deportees, and was able to establish contacts in Western countries and get support for resistance operations inside Lithuania (see Operation Jungle). It would persist abroad for many years as one of the groups representing Lithuania in exile.

Lithuanian Freedom Army during Nazi Germany's occupation opposed German policies, but did not begin armed resistance. The armed struggle began in mid-1944 when Red Army reached the Lithuanian borders after the Minsk Offensive. The LLA became the first wave of the Lithuanian partisans, armed anti-Soviet guerrilla fighters. It attempted to become the central command of the armed struggle. However, the organization headquarters was liquidated by the Soviet security forces (NKVD and KGB) by April 1946. Many Lithuanian Freedom Army fighters joined Lithuanian partisans.

Jewish partisans also fought against the Nazi occupation. In September 1943, the United Partisan Organization, led by Abba Kovner, attempted to start an uprising in the Vilna Ghetto, and later engaged in sabotage and guerrilla operations against the Nazi occupation.

In July 1944, as part of its Operation Tempest, the Polish Home Army launched Operation Ostra Brama, an attempt to recapture that city. See also Polish–Lithuanian relations during World War II.

As of January 2008, 723 Lithuanians were recognized by Israel as Righteous among the Nations for their efforts in saving Lithuania's Jews from the Holocaust. The total number of people who helped the Jews may be much higher.

Second Soviet occupation

Lithuanian partisans, known as the Forest Brothers, began guerrilla warfare against the Soviet forces as soon as the front passed over them in 1944, and continued an armed struggle until 1953. The core of this movement was made up of soldiers from the Territorial Defense Force who had disbanded with their weapons and uniforms and members of the Lithuanian Freedom Army, established in 1941. The underground had extensive clandestine radio and press. Thousands of people engaged in active and passive resistance against the Soviet authorities. The various resistance organizations eventually united under the Movement of the Struggle for the Freedom of Lithuania (Lietuvos Laisvės Kovų Sąjūdis, or LLKS), issuing a declaration of independence in 1949 that would ultimately be signed into law by the independent Republic of Lithuania in 1999.
The most famous of these partisans is probably Juozas Lukša, author of several books during the resistance and the subject of a recent film.

While armed resistance ended in the 1950s, nonviolent resistance continued in various forms (e.g. through Lithuanians living abroad, the Catholic press, safeguarding local traditions and the Lithuanian language, the Sąjūdis movement, etc.), until 1991 when Russia recognized the independence declared by Lithuania on March 11, 1990.

Significance of February 16
February 16, the date that Lithuania first declared its independence in 1918, played an important symbolic role during this period. The call for volunteers for the Lithuanian Territorial Defense Force, the VLIK declaration of independence, and the LLKS declaration of independence were all made on February 16. This day has become a national holiday in Lithuania.

See also

Occupation of the Baltic states
Guerrilla war in the Baltic states
Occupation of Estonia by Nazi Germany
Estonian anti-German resistance movement 1941–1944
Occupation of Latvia by Nazi Germany
Soviet occupation of Latvia in 1940
Latvian resistance movement
Occupation of Belarus by Nazi Germany
Belarusian resistance movement
History of Poland (1939–1945)
Polish resistance movement in World War II
Collaboration during World War II
Molotov–Ribbentrop Pact

References

Further reading
Remeikis, Thomas. The Decision of the Lithuanian Government to Accept the Soviet Ultimatum of June 14, 1940, Lituanus, Vol. 21, No. 4, Winter 1975. ISSN 0024-5089

Eastern European World War II resistance movements
Jewish Lithuanian history
Resistance in Lithuania
World War II resistance movements
Lithuanian Resistance in World War II